Sulaiman "The Bomb" Ismail is a former professional American Football player, and the younger brother of Raghib "The Rocket" Ismail and Qadry "The Missile" Ismail.  He played collegiately as a walk-on at the University of Texas-El Paso in 1995.  On February 14, 2001, he signed a three-year contract with the Arena Football League's New York Dragons, but was waived soon after.  He was claimed by the Greensboro Prowlers on April 4, but placed on the Inactive List on April 26.

Sulaiman has a black belt in Shotokan Karate, judo and jujutsu. He has had three professional boxing matches with a record of 1-2-0 and five amateur MMA matches with a record of 2-3-0.

References 
 Dragons Sign "The Bomb," Youngest of NFL's Ismail Brothers
 CNNSI.com Transactions, April 4, 2001
 CNNSI.com Transactions, April 26, 2001

Year of birth missing (living people)
Living people
American football wide receivers
UTEP Miners football players
Players of American football from Pennsylvania